Kosmos 497 ( meaning Cosmos 497), also known as DS-P1-I No.12 was a satellite which was used as a radar target for anti-ballistic missile tests. It was launched by the Soviet Union in 1972 as part of the Dnepropetrovsk Sputnik programme.

It was launched aboard a Kosmos-2I 63SM rocket, from Site 133/1 at Plesetsk. The launch occurred at 09:19:49 UTC on 30 June 1972.

It decayed from orbit on 7 November 1973.

Kosmos 497 was the twelfth of nineteen DS-P1-I satellites to be launched. Of these, all reached orbit successfully except the seventh.

See also

1972 in spaceflight

References

1972 in spaceflight
Kosmos 0497
1972 in the Soviet Union
Spacecraft launched in 1972
Dnepropetrovsk Sputnik program